Abbey Hill is a civil parish in Milton Keynes, Buckinghamshire, England.

Abbey Hill may also refer to several places in the United Kingdom:

 Abbey Hill, Somerset, a hamlet in the parish of Curland
 Abbey Hill School, Stoke-on-Trent, Staffordshire
 Abbey Hill, now Abbeyhill, district of Edinburgh
 Abbeyhill railway station
 Abbeyhill Junction, a railway junction
 Abbey Hills, an area in Oldham, Greater Manchester

See also
 Abby Hill, American painter
 Abigail Masham, Baroness Masham, born Abigail Hill